England was represented at the 2010 Commonwealth Games by Commonwealth Games England. The country went by the abbreviation ENG, will use the Cross of St George as its flag and "Jerusalem" as its victory anthem. It had previously used "Land of Hope and Glory" as its anthem at the Commonwealth Games, but decided to change following an "internet poll".

England's delegation is notable for including two Paralympic champions, who qualified to compete in Delhi against fully able-bodied athletes: Danielle Brown, who won a gold medal in archery at the 2008 Summer Paralympics, and Sarah Storey, who won two gold medals in cycling in 2008. They are the first English athletes with disabilities ever to compete in able-bodied events at the Commonwealth Games.

England 2010
Key
 Qualifiers / Medal Winners
 Top 8 Finish (Non Medal Winners)
 Non-Qualifiers / Non Top 8 Finish

Aquatics

Aquatics Medal Tally

Diving

Team England consists of 12 divers over 10 events. On 25 September 2010, it was announced that Peter Waterfield was withdrawing from the games.

Diving Medal Tally

Men

Women

Swimming

Team England consists of 45 swimmers over 44 events.

Swimming Medal Tally

Men

Men – EAD (Para-Sports)

Women

Women – EAD (Para-Sports)

Synchronised swimming

Team England consists of 2 swimmers over 2 events.

Synchronised Swimming Medal Tally

Women

Archery

Team England consists of 12 archers over 8 events

Archery Medal Tally

Men's Compound Individual

Men's Recurve Individual

Women's Compound Individual

Women's Recurve Individual

Team Events

Athletics

Team England consists of 91 athletes over 48 events

On 21 September 2010 it was announced that 2006 Commonwealth Games champions Christine Ohuruogu (Women's 400m), Lisa Dobriskey (Women's 1,500m) and Phillips Idowu (Men's Triple Jump) were withdrawing from the games. Ohuruogu and Dobriskey cited injury concerns whilst Idowu withdrew due to safety concerns.

Medal Tally

Men
Track

Field – Throws

Field – Jumps

Combined

Road

EAD (Para-Sports)

Women
Track

Field – Throws

Field – Jumps

Combined

Road

EAD (Para-Sports)

See also
 England at the Commonwealth Games
 England at the 2006 Commonwealth Games

References

External links
 Commonwealth Games England – Official website
 Commonwealth Games Info System – Official website

2010
Nations at the 2010 Commonwealth Games
Commonwealth Games